Sarin is a nerve agent.

Sarin may also refer to:

Places
 Sarin (star), the star Delta Herculis in the constellation of Hercules

Iran
 Sarin, Kermanshah
 Sarin, Zanjan
 Sazin or Sarin, Zanjan Province

Other uses
 Arun Sarin (born 1954), businessman best known for being the CEO of Vodafone
 Sarin, a short-lived band side-project of Stephen O'Malley

See also
 Saran (disambiguation)
 Saren (disambiguation)
 Sarine (disambiguation)
 Sarrin, a Syrian town
 Serin (disambiguation)